This is a list of years in Greece.

20th century

21st century

See also
 Timeline of modern Greek history

 
Greece history-related lists
Greece